Beautifully Broken is a 2018 American Christian drama film directed by Eric Welch. The film stars Benjamin A. Onyango, Scott William Winters, Michael W. Smith, Emily Hahn, Caitlin Nicol-Thomas and Eric Roberts in pivotal roles. It was released on August 24, 2018 by ArtEffects.

Plot
As three fathers fight to save their families, their lives become intertwined in an unlikely journey across the world, where they learn about forgiveness and reconciliation.

Cast
 Benjamin A. Onyango as William Mwizerwa
 Scott William Winters as Randy Hartley
 Michael W. Smith as Pastor Henry
 Emily Hahn as Andrea Hartley
 Caitlin Nicol-Thomas as Darla Hartley
 Eric Roberts as Larry Hartley
 Ditebogo Ledwaba as Umuhoza
 Sibulele Gcilitshana as Keza
 Bonko Khoza as Mugenzi

Release
Beautifully Broken was released in the United States on August 24, 2018.

Critical response

References

External links 
 
 
 

2018 films
2018 drama films
American drama films
Rwandan genocide films
Films about Christianity
Films about evangelicalism
English-language Rwandan films
American independent films
2018 independent films
2010s English-language films
2010s American films